Yamburg Airport  is a small airport in Yamalo-Nenets Autonomous Okrug, Russia located  northwest of Yamburg. It services medium-sized airliners and helicopters of all types.

Airlines and destinations

References

See also
 Vorkuta Airport

Airports built in the Soviet Union
Airports in the Arctic
Airports in Yamalo-Nenets Autonomous Okrug